The Third Way ( aṭ-Ṭarīq ath-Thālith) is a centrist Palestinian political party active in the Palestinian National Authority (PNA). Founded on 16 December 2005, the party was led by Salam Fayyad and Hanan Ashrawi. The party presents itself as an alternative to the two-party system of Hamas and Fatah.

In the January 2006 PLC elections the party received 2.41% of the popular vote and won two of the Council's 132 seats. After the disappointing election results, the party disappeared from the Palestinian arena, but in July 2015 party leaders held a series of meetings in Ramallah and Hebron to discuss the party's ability to reactivate its platform and return.

Members 

Party founder Salam Fayyad served as Finance Minister in the Palestinian Authority Government of February 2005, but resigned late 2005, to run for the 2006 elections. On 15 June 2007, Palestinian National Authority President Mahmoud Abbas named Salam Fayyad Prime Minister of the new emergency government, following Hamas' takeover of Gaza.

References

Palestinian political parties
2005 establishments in the Palestinian territories
Political parties established in 2005
Liberal parties
Centrist parties
Politics of the Palestinian National Authority